The Sørensen–Dice coefficient (see below for other names) is a statistic used to gauge the similarity of two samples. It was independently developed by the botanists Thorvald Sørensen and Lee Raymond Dice, who published in 1948 and 1945 respectively.

Name
The index is known by several other names, especially Sørensen–Dice index, Sørensen index and Dice's coefficient. Other variations include the "similarity coefficient" or "index", such as Dice similarity coefficient (DSC). Common alternate spellings for Sørensen are Sorenson, Soerenson and Sörenson, and all three can also be seen with the –sen ending.

Other names include:
 F1 score
 Czekanowski's binary (non-quantitative) index
 Measure of genetic similarity
 Zijdenbos similarity index, referring to a 1994 paper of Zijdenbos et al.

Formula
Sørensen's original formula was intended to be applied to discrete data. Given two sets, X and Y, it is defined as

where |X| and |Y| are the cardinalities of the two sets (i.e. the number of elements in each set).
The Sørensen index equals twice the number of elements common to both sets divided by the sum of the number of elements in each set.

When applied to Boolean data, using the definition of true positive (TP), false positive (FP), and false negative (FN), it can be written as

.

It is different from the Jaccard index which only counts true positives once in both the numerator and denominator. DSC is the quotient of similarity and ranges between 0 and 1. It can be viewed as a similarity measure over sets.

Similarly to the Jaccard index, the set operations can be expressed in terms of vector operations over binary vectors a and b:

which gives the same outcome over binary vectors and also gives a more general similarity metric over vectors in general terms.

For sets X and Y of keywords used in information retrieval, the coefficient may be defined as twice the shared information (intersection) over the sum of cardinalities :

When taken as a string similarity measure, the coefficient may be calculated for two strings, x and y using bigrams as follows:

where nt is the number of character bigrams found in both strings, nx is the number of bigrams in string x and ny is the number of bigrams in string y. For example, to calculate the similarity between:

night
nacht

We would find the set of bigrams in each word:
{ni,ig,gh,ht}
{na,ac,ch,ht}

Each set has four elements, and the intersection of these two sets has only one element: ht.

Inserting these numbers into the formula, we calculate, s = (2 · 1) / (4 + 4) = 0.25.

Continuous Dice Coefficient 
For a discrete ground truth and continuous measures the following formula can be used:

where c can be computed as follows:

If  which means no overlap between A and B, c is set to 1 arbitrarily.

Difference from Jaccard 
This coefficient is not very different in form from the Jaccard index.

Since the Sørensen–Dice coefficient does not satisfy the triangle inequality, it can be considered a semimetric version of the Jaccard index.

The function ranges between zero and one, like Jaccard. Unlike Jaccard, the corresponding difference function

is not a proper distance metric as it does not satisfy the triangle inequality. The simplest counterexample of this is given by the three sets {a}, {b}, and {a,b}, the distance between the first two being 1, and the difference between the third and each of the others being one-third. To satisfy the triangle inequality, the sum of any two of these three sides must be greater than or equal to the remaining side. However, the distance between {a} and {a,b} plus the distance between {b} and {a,b} equals 2/3 and is therefore less than the distance between {a} and {b} which is 1.

Applications
The Sørensen–Dice coefficient is useful for ecological community data (e.g. Looman & Campbell, 1960). Justification for its use is primarily  empirical rather than theoretical (although it can be justified  theoretically as the intersection of two fuzzy sets). As compared to Euclidean distance, the Sørensen distance retains sensitivity in more heterogeneous data sets and gives less weight to outliers. Recently the Dice score (and its variations, e.g. logDice taking a logarithm of it) has become popular in computer lexicography for measuring the lexical association score of two given words.
logDice is also used as part of the Mash Distance for genome and metagenome distance estimation
Finally, Dice is used in image segmentation, in particular for comparing algorithm output against reference masks in medical applications.

Abundance version
The expression is easily extended to abundance instead of presence/absence of species. This quantitative version is known by several names:
 Quantitative Sørensen–Dice index
 Quantitative Sørensen index
 Quantitative Dice index
 Bray–Curtis similarity (1 minus the Bray-Curtis dissimilarity)
 Czekanowski's quantitative index
 Steinhaus index
 Pielou's percentage similarity
 1 minus the Hellinger distance
 Proportion of specific agreement or positive agreement

See also
 Correlation
 F1 score
 Jaccard index
 Hamming distance
 Mantel test
 Morisita's overlap index
 Most frequent k characters
 Overlap coefficient
 Renkonen similarity index (due to Olavi Renkonen)
 Tversky index
 Universal adaptive strategy theory (UAST)

References

External links

Information retrieval evaluation
String metrics
Measure theory
Similarity measures